Sebastian Iwanicki (born September 3, 1985) is a Polish footballer (midfielder) playing currently for ŁKS Łódź. He is a trainee of Agrykola Warszawa.

Clubs 
 2001-2002  Agrykola Warszawa
 2002-2004  Legia Warsaw II
   2004     Świt Nowy Dwór Mazowiecki
   2005     Górnik Zabrze
 2005-2006  GLKS Nadarzyn
 2006–present  Unia Janikowo

External links
Player profile on the official club website

1985 births
Living people
Polish footballers
Górnik Zabrze players
Unia Janikowo players
Footballers from Warsaw
Association football midfielders